Longstone or Long Stone may refer to

Places
Longstone, Edinburgh, a suburb of Edinburgh, Scotland
Longstone, County Armagh, a townland in County Armagh, Northern Ireland
Longstone, Cornwall, a hamlet in Cornwall, England
Longstone, Isles of Scilly, a place in the Isles of Scilly, Cornwall, England
Longstone, Somerset, a location in England
Longstone, St Ives, a location in Cornwall, England
Great Longstone and Little Longstone, two villages in Derbyshire, England
Longstone Lighthouse, a lighthouse on Longstone Rock, Farne Islands, Northumberland, England

Prehistoric
The Longstone, Mottistone, a standing stone on the Isle of Wight, England
The Longstones, two standing stones near Beckhampton, Wiltshire, England
Longstone Rath, a prehistoric ringfort with a standing stone near Cullen, Co. Tipperary, Ireland
Boswens Menhir, Cornwall, England, also known as the Long Stone
The Long Stone, a standing stone on Shovel Down, Dartmoor, England

Other
Longstone (band), an experimental, electronic music collective formed in Cheltenham, England
Longstone GAC, a Gaelic Football club from Co. Down, Northern Ireland